Marcel Clech (1905 – 1944) was a French agent in the French section of the Special Operations Executive during the Second World War. He was sent to France on three missions and worked as a wireless operator in three different networks before his arrest, and was executed at Mauthausen Concentration Camp.

Early life 
Marcel Rémy Clech was born in Brittany on 11 October 1905. He lived in London working as a taxi driver.

World War II
He joined the Special Operations Executive, section F, as a wireless operator. He was commissioned as Lieutenant in the British Army on the general list

First mission 
On 1 August 1940 a motorboat attempted to land three French agents: Clech, Tilly, and Victor Bernard at Carentec in Brittany but had to abort the mission after coming under fire and returned to England.

Second mission 
Clech became the radio operator of the 'Autogiro' network of Pierre de Vomécourt (codename "Lucas").

In Operation Delay II Peter Churchill’s mission was to land four SOE agents  on the French Riviera by submarine.
On 26 February 1942 Churchill flew from Bristol to Gibraltar with two radio operators, Isidore Newman ("Julien") for the Urchin network and Edward Zeff ("Matthieu") for the Spruce network, where they were joined by Marcel Clech ("Bastien"), radio operator for the Autogiro network, and Victor Gerson ("René"), an SOE agent on a special mission to organise the Vic Escape Line. They travelled in the submarine HMS Unbroken to Antibes where on the night of 21 April 1942 Churchill took Newman and Zeff and their radios to the shore by canoe, and led them to their contact Dr Élie Lévy. Churchill then returned to the submarine and dropped off Clech and Gerson by canoe at Pointe d’Agay near Fréjus before returning to the UK.

Arriving in Lyon in early May, Clech learnt that Pierre de Vomécourt, the organiser of the Autogiro network, had been arrested on 25 April. His mission was then modified and he was sent to Tours, where he was assigned to the Monkepuzzle network of Raymond Flower ("Gaspar"). He worked there from 3 August. On the night of 14 April he was brought back to London by Westland Lysander, piloted by Henri Déricourt.

Third mission
Clech became the radio operator of Inventor network of Sidney Jones ("Élie"), with Vera Leigh ("Simone") as courier.

On the night of 14 May 1943 he was brought by Lysander piloted by Henri Déricourt  with Sidney Jones and Vera Leigh to set up the Inventor network. Julienne Aisner accompanied them and became courier of the Farrier circuit.

The network was betrayed by double agent Roger Bardet, and on 30 October Leigh was arrested. On 19 November Clech was arrested after his transmissions in Boulogne-Billancourt had been located by the German direction-finding service. Jones was arrested the next day. Clech was deported to Mauthausen concentration camp where he was executed on 24 March 1944. Leigh and Jones were also executed, Leigh at Natzweiler-Struthof concentration camp, Jones at Mauthausen.

Recognition

Distinctions 

 France: Médaille de la Résistance

Monuments 
 As one of the 104 agents of section F who gave their lives for the liberation of France, Marcel Clech is honoured at The Valençay SOE Memorial, Indre, France.
 Brookwood Memorial, Surrey, panel 21, column 3.

Notes

References 
 Peter Churchill Duel of Wits, Hodder and Stoughton, 1953.
 The F Section Memorial, Gerry Holdsworth Special Forces Charitable Trust, 1992
 Hugh Verity, We landed by Moonlight, Crecy Publishing, 1978. 

1905 births
1944 deaths
People from Brittany
French Special Operations Executive personnel
Executed spies
French people executed in Nazi concentration camps
British Army personnel killed in World War II